Michael Martin "Nick" Basca (December 4, 1917November 11, 1944) was a professional American football halfback in the National Football League. He played one season for the Philadelphia Eagles (1941) after attending Villanova University.

Basca enlisted in the United States Army after the attack on Pearl Harbor alongside his brothers. In 1942, he was a member of Robert Neyland's All-Army football team that played against NFL teams in fundraising games. Assigned as a tank commander, he served in the 4th Armored Division in Europe and participated in the Normandy landings, where he landed on Utah Beach. The 4th helped lead the Third Army through Europe. On November 11, 1944, Basca was killed instantly when his tank was struck by a German 88-millimeter anti-tank round after four months in combat.

A year after his death, the Eagles honored Basca prior to their game against the New York Giants. His body was returned to Pennsylvania in 1948 and arrived nine days after the Eagles won the 1948 NFL Championship Game. He is currently honored in the Football's Wartime Heroes display at the Pro Football Hall of Fame.

References

External links
Football's Wartime Heroes

1917 births
1944 deaths
People from Phoenixville, Pennsylvania
Players of American football from Pennsylvania
American football halfbacks
Villanova Wildcats football players
Philadelphia Eagles players
United States Army non-commissioned officers
United States Army personnel killed in World War II
Tank commanders